Eyles is a surname. Notable people with the surname include:

Derek Charles Eyles (1902–1974), British illustrator
Don Eyles (1944), retired computer engineer, worked on the computer systems in the Apollo 11 Lunar Landing
Francis Eyles (disambiguation), multiple people
Frederick Eyles (1864–1937), English-born Rhodesian botanist, politician and journalist
John Eyles (disambiguation), multiple people
Leonora Eyles (1889–1960), novelist, memoirist and feminist
Nick Eyles, University of Toronto professor
Thomas Eyles (c. 1769–1835), Royal Navy officer

See also
Eyles-Stiles Baronets